Lava lakes are large volumes of molten lava, usually basaltic, contained in a volcanic vent, crater, or broad depression. The term is used to describe both lava lakes that are wholly or partly molten and those that are solidified (sometimes referred to as frozen lava lakes).

Formation
Lava lakes can form in three ways:
from one or more vents in a crater that erupts enough lava to partially fill the crater; or
when lava pours into a crater or broad depression and partially fills the crater; or
atop a new vent that erupts lava continuously for a period of several weeks or more and slowly builds a crater progressively higher than the surrounding ground.

Behaviors
Lava lakes occur in a variety of volcanic systems, ranging from the basaltic Erta Ale lake in Ethiopia and the basaltic andesite volcano of Villarrica, Chile, to the unique phonolitic lava lake at Mt. Erebus, Antarctica. Lava lakes have been observed to exhibit a range of behaviours. A "constantly circulating, apparently steady-state" lava lake was observed during the 1969–1971 Mauna Ulu eruption of Kīlauea, Hawaii. By contrast, a lava lake at the 1983–1984 Puʻu ʻŌʻō eruption of Kilauea displayed cyclic behaviour with a period of 5–20 minutes; gas "pierced the surface" of the lake, and the lava rapidly drained back down the conduit before the onset of a new phase of lake activity.
The behaviour observed is influenced by the combined effects of pressure within the reservoir, exsolution and decompression of gas bubbles within the conduit and, potentially, exsolution of bubbles within the magma reservoir. Superimposed upon this is the effect of bubbles rising through the liquid, and coalescence of bubbles within the conduit. The interactions of these effects can create either a steady-state recirculating lake, or a lake level that periodically rises and then falls.<ref>Witham and Llewellin (2006). "Stability of Lava Lakes". '+Journal of Volcanology and Geothermal Research vol. 158 p.321–332</ref>

Notable examples
Persistent lava lakes are a rare phenomenon. Only a few volcanoes have hosted persistent or near-persistent lava lakes during recent decades:
Ambrym, Vanuatu
Mount Erebus, Ross Island, Antarctica
Erta Ale, Ethiopia

Kīlauea, Big Island, Hawaii 
Masaya volcano, Nicaragua
Mount Michael, Saunders Island, South Sandwich Islands
Mount Nyiragongo, Democratic Republic of the Congo
Mount Yasur, Vanuatu

The lava lakes at Ambrym volcano disappeared after a large eruption in December 2018.

For many years, Kīlauea had two persistent lava lakes: one in the Halemaʻumaʻu vent cavity within the summit caldera, and another within the Puʻu ʻŌʻō cone located on the east rift zone of the volcano. In May 2018, both of these lava lakes disappeared as a result of increased activity in Kīlauea's east rift zone. The lava lake at Halemaʻumaʻu returned in December 2020, after Kīlauea's first eruption in over two years. The lava lake solidified after the eruption ended in May 2021, but returned again when eruptive activity at Halemaʻumaʻu resumed on September 29, 2021. The lava lake is still active as of September 2022.

Nyiragongo's lava lake has usually been the largest and most voluminous in recent history, reaching 700 meters wide in 1982, although Masaya is believed to have hosted an even larger lava lake at the time of the Spanish conquest, being 1,000 meters wide in 1670. The lava lake at Masaya came back in January 2016.

In addition to the aforementioned persistent lava lakes, a certain number of occurrences of temporary lava lakes (sometimes called lava ponds or lava pools'', depending on their size and nature) have also been observed and are listed in the following table.

List of volcanoes having displayed past or present lava lake activity

See also
 
 Loki Patera

References

External links

 Lava lake in Nyiragongo Volcano crater. Video on France 24 TV
 Into the mouth of a volcano, video footage of lava lake in Vanuatu's Marum volcano

 
Volcanic landforms